Michael Stahl-David (born October 28, 1982) is an American actor, known for his role as Sean Donnelly on the NBC drama series The Black Donnellys and his lead role as Robert "Rob" Hawkins in the J. J. Abrams-produced film Cloverfield and the fanmade short film The Cloverfield Files.

Early life
Stahl-David was born in Chicago, Illinois, the son of physicians. He graduated from Columbia College Chicago. He is the older brother to Eric Stahl-David and R. Andrew Stahl-David, both of whom graduated from Whitney Young Magnet High School. Prior to his acting career, Stahl-David was a graffiti artist in Chicago.

Career
Stahl-David began his acting career in 2001, when he played a minor role of Rossetti in New Port South. Later in 2003, he also played a minor role as Craig in Uncle Nino. During this time he was active in the Chicago theater scene, appearing in plays at the Steppenwolf Theatre (One Arm, Theater District), Victory Gardens Theater (Cider House Rules, Lost in Yonkers), and the Goodman Theatre (The Goat, or Who Is Sylvia?) Shortly after arriving in New York in 2005, he appeared as Peter in The Diary of Anne Frank at the Papermill Playhouse. In the winter of 2007 he enjoyed critical success in his role in The Overwhelming Off-Broadway. Stahl-David began his television acting career in 2007, when he made a guest appearance as Riordan Grady in the series Law & Order: Criminal Intent episode "Players". Later in 2007, he portrayed Sean Donnelly, one of the four Irish brothers, in the short-lived series The Black Donnellys. His most recent film appearance was in J.J. Abrams' Cloverfield reprising his role as Rob. In September 2008, Stahl-David starred in and directed the web series Michael Stahl-David: Behind the Star on Crackle.

In 2010, Stahl-David starred in the ABC mockumentary series My Generation, which was cancelled after two episodes due to low ratings. Stahl-David starred as Kevin in the Off-Broadway play Picked at New York City's Vineyard Theatre from April 6 to May 15, 2011. Stahl-David also starred in the 2014 paranormal romance film In Your Eyes as one of the lead roles.

Filmography

Film

Television

Web

Theatre

References

External links
 
 

1982 births
21st-century American male actors
American male film actors
American male stage actors
American male television actors
Living people
Male actors from Chicago